Martin Bianchi (born 11 February 1981) is an Argentine cross-country skier. He competed in the men's 15 kilometre classical event at the 2006 Winter Olympics.

References

1981 births
Living people
Argentine male cross-country skiers
Olympic cross-country skiers of Argentina
Cross-country skiers at the 2006 Winter Olympics
Skiers from Buenos Aires